Ethel is an unincorporated community in Arkansas County, Arkansas, United States. Ethel has a post office with ZIP code 72048.

Education
Residents are in the DeWitt School District. It operates DeWitt High School.

References

Unincorporated communities in Arkansas County, Arkansas
Unincorporated communities in Arkansas